Philippe Guimarães (born 18 March 1991), commonly known as PH, is a Brazilian footballer who plays as a midfielder for Paysandu.

References

External links
Philippe Guimarães at ZeroZero

1991 births
Living people
Brazilian footballers
Brazilian expatriate footballers
Resende Futebol Clube players
Bangu Atlético Clube players
America Football Club (RJ) players
FK Kukësi players
Vila Nova Futebol Clube players
Tombense Futebol Clube players
Boa Esporte Clube players
Associação Ferroviária de Esportes players
Paysandu Sport Club players
Campeonato Brasileiro Série B players
Campeonato Brasileiro Série C players
Association football midfielders
Brazilian expatriate sportspeople in Albania
Expatriate footballers in Albania